State Highway 4 is the shortest of New Zealand's eight national highways. It runs north-south across rugged hill country, forming a short cut between two points on State Highway 3 thereby avoiding Taranaki and the coasts of the North and South Taranaki Bights. Distances are measured from north to south.

For most of its length SH4 is a two-lane single carriageway, with at-grade intersections and property accesses, both in rural and urban areas. The NZ Transport Agency (NZTA) classifies SH 4 as a primary collector road, except between National Park (SH 47) and Tohunga Junction (SH 49) where it is classified an arterial road.

Route
The highway commences from a junction on SH 3 11 km south of Te Kuiti. It heads south-southeast, climbing initially, then descending along the winding valleys of the Ōhura and Ongarue Rivers, two tributaries of the Whanganui. The Ongarue joins the Whanganui close to Taumarunui, and here the highway turns east briefly, ascending the Whanganui's valley before turning south to skirt the North Island Volcanic Plateau. The peaks of the plateau's volcanoes are clearly visible from the highway, especially that of the southernmost, Ruapehu.

At Horopito the highway veers southwest briefly, following a tributary of the Mangawhero River until it joins with this river near Raetihi. The highway continues to descend the Mangawhero's valley to within 40 km of its mouth, then heads west across rolling hill country to the valley of the Whanganui River, which it follows for the last 15 km of its journey into Whanganui.

Major junctions

See also
List of New Zealand state highways
List of roads and highways, for notable or famous roads worldwide

References

External links
 New Zealand Transport Agency

4